The Fleming Formation is a geologic formation in East Texas and Louisiana. It preserves fossils dating back to the Neogene period.

See also

 List of fossiliferous stratigraphic units in Louisiana
 Paleontology in Louisiana

References

 

Neogene Louisiana
Neogene geology of Texas